The St. Catharines Athletics are a defunct Senior "A" box lacrosse team from St. Catharines, Ontario, Canada.

History
To be added.

Championships
Canadian Lacrosse Association: 1889 - 1890, 1905, 1907 - 1910
Senior "A" League Titles: 1938 - 1941, 1944 - 1946
Mann Cups: 1938, 1940, 1941, 1944, 1946

See also
 Bob McCready
 St. Catharines Athletics Jr. A

External links
The Bible of Lacrosse
Unofficial OLA Page
Gardell's History of the Athletics

Ontario Lacrosse Association teams
Sport in St. Catharines
Lacrosse clubs established in 1877
1877 establishments in Ontario